Metochus is a genus of dirt-colored seed bugs in the family Rhyparochromidae. There are about 11 described species in Metochus, found in Indomalaya and eastern Asia.

Species
These 11 species belong to the genus Metochus:
 Metochus abbreviatus Scott, 1874
 Metochus assimilis (Dallas, 1852)
 Metochus hainanensis Zheng & Zou, 1981
 Metochus horni (Breddin, 1906)
 Metochus jacobsoni (Breddin, 1906)
 Metochus nudipes (Breddin, 1906)
 Metochus procericornis (Breddin, 1908)
 Metochus schultheissi (Breddin, 1906)
 Metochus thoracicus Zheng & Zou, 1981
 Metochus uniguttatus (Thunberg, 1822)
 Metochus villosulus (Breddin, 1906)

References

External links

 

Rhyparochromidae